Ploumagoar is a commune in the Côtes-d'Armor department of Brittany in northwestern France.

Population

Inhabitants of Ploumagoar are called ploumagoariens in French.

Breton language
The municipality launched a linguistic plan through Ya d'ar brezhoneg on 11 February 2008.

See also
Communes of the Côtes-d'Armor department

References

External links

Official website 

Communes of Côtes-d'Armor